Kim Lorraine McDonald (born 9 May 1967) is a New Zealand former cricketer who played as a right-handed batter. She appeared in 1 Test match and 6 One Day Internationals for New Zealand between 1991 and 1992. She played domestic cricket for Auckland.

References

External links

1964 births
Living people
People from Morrinsville
New Zealand women cricketers
New Zealand women Test cricketers
New Zealand women One Day International cricketers
Auckland Hearts cricketers
Cricketers from Waikato